Haydn Islwyn Evans (25 December 1898 – 13 May 1974) was a Welsh international rugby union player who played club rugby union for Swansea and Llanelli. Evans was capped four times for Wales, all during the 1922 Five Nations Championship.

Rugby career
Evans was first selected for Wales in 1922 while representing Swansea at club level. Evans first game was against England at the Cardiff Arms Park under the captaincy of Tom Parker. Wales won in style, scoring a then record eight tries. All five Swansea players representing Wales in that match scored, Evans, Parker, Bowen and Palmer all scored tries, and Joe Rees completed two conversions. Evans was back on the scoresheet in his very next match, scoring a very late drop goal to grab a draw against Scotland at Inverleith. Evans scored in both remaining games of the tournament, scoring tries in both wins over Ireland and then France. In the game against France, Evans was not originally chosen to play, but shortly before the kick-off the Welsh selectors dropped Frank Palmer and Harold Davies, and replaced them with Evans and Cliff Richards. Although becoming a Championship winner and scoring in every international game, Evans was not selected to represent Wales after 1922. This was due to having to retire from rugby because of a serious cartilage injury to his knee.

International matches played
Wales
  1922
  1922
  1922
  1922

Bibliography

References

1898 births
1974 deaths
Llanelli RFC players
Rugby union centres
Rugby union players from Llanelli
Swansea RFC players
Wales international rugby union players
Welsh rugby union players